Playing Possum is the fifth studio album by American singer-songwriter Carly Simon, released by Elektra Records, on April 21, 1975.

It was Simon's third consecutive album to reach the top 10 on the Billboard Pop albums chart, peaking at No. 10 in June 1975. The lead single from the album, "Attitude Dancing", which featured Carole King on backing vocals, was also a success, peaking at No. 21 on Billboard Pop singles chart, and No. 18 on the Billboard Adult Contemporary chart. A second single, "Waterfall", which featured prominent backing vocals by Simon's then-husband James Taylor, didn't fare as well, reaching no higher than No. 78 on the Pop singles chart. It fared much better on the Adult Contemporary chart, entering the Top 40 and peaking at No. 21. The album's third and final single "More and More" was co-written by New Orleans pianist Dr. John, who also played piano on the track, along with Ringo Starr on drums, but it peaked no higher than No. 94 on the Pop singles chart.

Reception and packaging

In his review of the album, Stephen Holden of Rolling Stone said it "represents a breakthrough of sorts for Simon", in her continued shift from a "sensitive singer/songwriter role" to a "rock songstress". He wrote that "Attitude Dancing" was "easily the most exciting Carly Simon cut since 'You're So Vain.'" Other standouts from his review were "After the Storm", "Love Out in the Street", "Are You Ticklish", "Look Me in the Eyes", "Waterfall", and "Slave". Cash Box said of the single "More and More" that "Carly belts out a hard blues vocal over barrelhouse piano, with Memphis style horns and a soulful female chorus lending support."

Today, Playing Possum may best be remembered for its controversial cover photograph, which shows the singer wearing only a black negligee, sheer-to-waist pantyhose, and knee-high black boots. The photographer was Norman Seeff. It was nominated for Best Album Package at the 18th Annual Grammy Awards in Feb. 1976. In 1991, it ranked at No. 20 on the Rolling Stones list of the 100 greatest album covers.

Simon further included photographs from the session in the booklets accompanying her three-disc boxed set Clouds in My Coffee (1995) and the two-disc Anthology (2003). The latter also includes the singles "Attitude Dancing" and "Waterfall".

Awards

Notes
  The photographer was Norman Seeff.

Other honors and recognitions
 1991 – Playing Possum ranked No. 20 on Rolling Stone's 100 Greatest Album Covers of All-Time list.

Track listing
Credits adapted from the album's liner notes.

Personnel 
Credits adapted from the album's liner notes

Musicians

Production

Charts
Album – Billboard (United States)

Album – International

Singles – Billboard (United States)

References

External links
Carly Simon's Official Website

1975 albums
Carly Simon albums
Elektra Records albums
Albums produced by Richard Perry
Albums recorded at Sunset Sound Recorders
Albums recorded at A&M Studios
Disco albums by American artists